The 2021–22 Nedbank Cup is the 2021–22 edition of South Africa's premier knockout club football (soccer) competition, the Nedbank Cup.

Preliminary rounds

Eight teams from the SAFA Second Division (called the ABC Motsepe League for sponsorship reasons) qualify for the round of 32. One team from each of the nine provinces is selected, with two teams drawn to play each other in a knockout to reduce the number to eight. The nine teams from the provinces were:

Western Cape -  Santos FC 
Northern cape - NC Pro`s
Eastern Cape - Sinenkani FC
North West - Black Eagles
KZN - Summerfield Dynamos
Limpopo - Mikhado FC
Free State - Mathaithai FC
Gauteng - African All Stars
Mpumalanga - Sivutsa Stars

Mathaithai and Mikhado were selected to play each other, with Mathaithai winning the playoff.    

Eight teams from the National First Division also qualify, with the sixteen teams meeting in a preliminary round.

Round of 32
The last 32 of 2021-22 is made up of 16 teams from the South African Premier Division, 8 teams from the National First Division and 8 from the SAFA Second Division.

Round of 16

Quarter-finals

Semi-finals

Final

South Africa
2021–22 in South African soccer
Nedbank Cup